The St. Bonaventure Cathedral (also Cuautitlán Cathedral)  is a Catholic church, part of the convent of the same name in the Municipality of Cuautitlán, State of Mexico. It was designated as a cathedral on February 5, 1979, with the founding of the Diocese of Cuautitlán.

The complex is named after St. Bonaventure after the day's saint on the date of the first visit of the first friars in 1524. It was not until 1532, however, when the planned construction of what was the first Franciscan monastery and temple began in Cuautitlán, with Friar Alonso de Herrera as the first guardian and Friar Alonso de Guadalupe as the first conventual.

The current cathedral (the third convent) was built between 1655 and 1732.

The cathedral combines two styles, Baroque and Neoclassical.

The cathedral has a Latin cross plan with elevated proportions, and a nave with transept of Baroque columns.

See also
Roman Catholicism in Mexico
St. Bonaventure

References

Cua
Buildings and structures in the State of Mexico
Baroque church buildings in Mexico
Roman Catholic churches completed in 1732
1732 establishments in New Spain
18th-century Roman Catholic church buildings in Mexico